Ruth Ashton Taylor (born April 20, 1922) is an American retired television and radio newscaster, with a career in broadcasting that spanned over 50 years. She was the first female newscaster on television in Los Angeles and the West Coast. She has received many awards and honors, including a Lifetime Achievement Emmy Award and a star on the Hollywood Walk of Fame.

Ashton turned 100 on April 20, 2022.

Early life and education
A native of Los Angeles, Ruth Ashton graduated in 1939 from Long Beach Polytechnic High School. Taylor completed her undergraduate degree at Scripps College. She relocated to New York City thereafter, receiving a master's degree in journalism from Columbia University in 1944.

Career 
Following her graduation, she took a job as a news writer at CBS radio, taking a place among the original members of the documentary unit of Edward R. Murrow.

When she first began as a writer and producer there, she had no thoughts of going on air as, to her knowledge, it simply wasn't done in major news markets. According to Ashton, CBS management didn't want to broadcast women because they "just didn't like those squeaky voices". However, by 1949, she was on the air, interviewing such notable individuals as Albert Einstein. Eventually, she was transferred to a religious program, and, disappointed by her exclusion from news broadcasting, she left CBS radio in New York and returned to Los Angeles.

In 1951, she became the first woman in Los Angeles or on the West Coast on television news when she took a job with LA's KNXT-TV (now KCBS). Although originally hired to cover the "Women's Angle", she has indicated in interviews that the lack of conventional roles for women in broadcasting gave her considerable freedom in the stories she selected to cover. In 1958, she left briefly to work as a public information officer at a college before returning in 1962. She officially retired in 1989, but continued occasionally contributing into her 70s. As a news reporter and program host, she became an influential figure on subsequent female journalists, with numerous industry awards and a career that included notable interviews with such diverse people as Jimmy Carter and Jimmy Durante.

Honors and awards 
During her time in broadcasting, Ashton Taylor became a widely known and celebrated figure. In 1983, The Los Angeles Times indicated that she had a reputation as "one of the best newspeople in television". A 2007 article in the Journal of Broadcasting & Electronic Media described her as "one of the most recognizable people on radio and television in Los Angeles"

She received a Star in the Hollywood Walk of Fame in 1990.

Other notable honors include a Governors Award for Lifetime Achievement bestowed by the Academy of Television Arts and Sciences and a Diamond Achievement Award from Women in Communications (1984).

References

External links
2008 interview, CBS
Ruth Ashton Taylor interviews Governor of California George Deukmejian on KCBS Los Angeles, 1990 

1922 births
Living people
American television journalists
American women television journalists
American centenarians
Women centenarians
Radio personalities from Los Angeles
Scripps College alumni
Columbia University alumni